Melphalan, sold under the brand name Alkeran among others, is a chemotherapy medication used to treat multiple myeloma, ovarian cancer, melanoma, and AL amyloidosis. It is taken by mouth or by injection into a vein.

Common side effects include nausea and bone marrow suppression. Other severe side effects may include anaphylaxis and the development of other cancers. Use during pregnancy may result in harm to the fetus. Melphalan belongs to the class of nitrogen mustard alkylating agents. It works by interfering with the creation of DNA and RNA.

Melphalan was approved for medical use in the United States in 1964. It is on the World Health Organization's List of Essential Medicines. It is available as a generic medication.

Medical uses 
It is used to treat multiple myeloma, ovarian cancer, AL amyloidosis, and occasionally malignant melanoma.

The agent was first investigated as a possible drug for use in melanoma, it was not found to be effective.

In 2016, it was approved in the U.S. for:
 use as a high-dose conditioning treatment prior to hematopoietic progenitor (stem) cell transplantation in multiple myeloma (MM) patients
 the palliative treatment of MM patients for whom oral therapy is not appropriate

Melphalan is used to treat ocular retinoblastoma, a pediatric solid tumor.  This is accomplished via transarterial catheter based slow pulsed infusion into the ophthalmic artery.

Side effects 
Common side effects include:
 Nausea
 Bone marrow suppression, including
 Decreased white blood cell count causing increased risk of infection
 Decreased platelet count causing increased risk of bleeding

Less common side effects include:
 Severe allergic reactions
 Pulmonary fibrosis (scarring of lung tissue) including fatal outcomes (usually only with prolonged use)
 Hair loss
 Interstitial pneumonitis
 Rash
 Itching
 Irreversible bone marrow failure due to melphalan not being withdrawn early enough
 Cardiac arrest

Mechanism of action 
Melphalan chemically alters the DNA nucleotide guanine through alkylation, and causes linkages between strands of DNA. This chemical alteration inhibits DNA synthesis and RNA synthesis, functions necessary for cells to survive. These changes cause cytotoxicity in both dividing and non-dividing tumor cells. Tumor cells spend less time in resting phases than normal cells so at any given time, they are more likely to be metabolically active than most normal host cells. The rationale behind incorporating an alkylating function in a molecule resembling a primary cellular metabolite was to get a greater safety margin by fooling tumor cells into taking up the toxin preferentially.

Synthesis 

4-Nitro-L-phenylalanine (1) was converted to its phthalimide by heating with phthalic anhydride, and this was converted to its ethyl ester (2). Catalytic hydrogenation produced the corresponding aniline. Heating in acid with oxirane, followed by treatment with phosphorus oxychloride provided the bischloride, and removal of the protecting groups by heating in hydrochloric acid gave melphalan (3).

Society and culture

Legal status 
On 17 September 2020, the Committee for Medicinal Products for Human Use (CHMP) of the European Medicines Agency (EMA) adopted a positive opinion, recommending the granting of a marketing authorization for melphalan. The applicant for this medicinal product is ADIENNE S.r.l. S.U. Melphalan was approved for medical use in the European Union in November 2020.

References

External links
 

Chloroethyl compounds
IARC Group 1 carcinogens
Nitrogen mustards
Specialty drugs
World Health Organization essential medicines
Wikipedia medicine articles ready to translate